Otto Hofbauer (born 4 January 1932) is an Austrian footballer. He played in two matches for the Austria national football team in 1955.

References

External links
 

1932 births
Living people
Austrian footballers
Austria international footballers
Place of birth missing (living people)
Association footballers not categorized by position